Chrostosoma rica is a moth of the subfamily Arctiinae. It was described by Paul Dognin in 1897. It is found in Ecuador.

References

BHL
"Chrostosoma Hübner, [1819]" at Markku Savela's Lepidoptera and Some Other Life Forms. Retrieved July 21, 2017.

Chrostosoma
Moths described in 1897